Taskmaster was an American comedy panel game show. The Taskmaster format was originally created by British comedian Alex Horne during the Edinburgh Festival Fringe in 2010, then became a UK television show on Dave in 2015. The American adaptation was produced for Comedy Central in 2017. Based on the original British version, the American TV series stars comedian and actor Reggie Watts in the titular role of the Taskmaster, issuing simple comedic and bizarre tasks to regular contestants, with Horne acting as Watts' assistant and umpire during the challenges.

The series was recorded in California, and the contestants were Lisa Lampanelli, Freddie Highmore, Ron Funches, Dillon Francis, and Kate Berlant. It premiered on April 27, 2018 and was won by Kate Berlant. Watts has said that there will not be a second season.

Episodes
Panellists for this series were Dillon Francis, Freddie Highmore, Kate Berlant, Lisa Lampanelli and Ron Funches, with Berlant being the overall winner.

Reception
The show received mostly positive reviews, though some critics compared it unfavorably to the original series.

Davies and Horne later said the show would have worked better with fewer changes from the UK format.

References

2010s American comedy game shows
2018 American television series debuts
American television series based on British television series
Comedy Central game shows
English-language television shows
Television game shows with incorrect disambiguation
2018 American television series endings
Taskmaster (TV series)